"Get Over It" is a song by the Eagles released as a single after a fourteen-year breakup. It was also the first song written by bandmates Don Henley and Glenn Frey when the band reunited. "Get Over It" was played live for the first time during their Hell Freezes Over tour in 1994. It returned the band to the U.S. top 40 after a fourteen-year absence, peaking at No. 31 on the Billboard Hot 100 chart. It also hit No. 4 on the Billboard Mainstream Rock Tracks chart. The song was not played live by the Eagles after the Hell Freezes Over tour in 1994. It remains the group's last top 40 hit in the U.S.

Theme
The song is about Henley's frustration and contempt for others (such as TV talk show guests) blaming their failures, mental breakdowns, and financial problems on those who he feels do not deserve it, then believing that the world owes them a favor. The song's lyrics include "Old Billy was right: let's kill all the lawyers—kill 'em tonight", which references William Shakespeare's Henry VI, Part II line "The first thing we do, let's kill all the lawyers".

Personnel
Don Henley: lead vocals 
Glenn Frey: lead and rhythm guitar, backing vocals
Don Felder: lead and rhythm guitar
Joe Walsh: slide guitar, rhythm guitar
Timothy B. Schmit: bass guitar, backing vocals
Scott F. Crago: drums

Charts

Weekly charts

Year-end charts

References

1994 songs
1994 singles
Eagles (band) songs
Songs written by Glenn Frey
Songs written by Don Henley
Geffen Records singles